Australian Draughts Federation is the governing body for the sport of Draughts in Australia. The national body has eight state member associations.

See also

Australian Bridge Federation
Australian Chess Federation
Australian Go Association
Poker Federation of Australia

References

Draughts organizations
Sports governing bodies in Australia
2007 establishments in Australia
Sports organizations established in 2007